Josh Wooden (born 14 November 1978) is a former Australian rules footballer in the Australian Football League.

He was recruited as the number 24 draft pick in the 1996 AFL Draft from Lockhart. Wooden made his debut for the West Coast Eagles in Round 1, 1997 against the Sydney Swans.

He retired from football in 2007 at the age of 28, due to a nagging hip problem.

References

External links

1978 births
Living people
Australian rules footballers from New South Wales
West Coast Eagles players
NSW/ACT Rams players
East Perth Football Club players
Claremont Football Club players
Subiaco Football Club players